Chebyshev may refer to:
 Pafnuty Chebyshev: A Russian mathematician
 Chebyshev function: Number-theory functions
 Chebyshev polynomials
 Chebyshev filter
 Chebyshev's inequality
 Chebyshev (crater): A lunar crater
 2010 Chebyshev: An asteroid from the asteroid belt

See also 
 Chibisov (disambiguation)